Jane Cadwell (February 16, 1915 – April 29, 2000), also known by her married name Jane Lott, was an American competition swimmer who represented the United States at the 1932 Summer Olympics in Los Angeles, California.  As a 17-year-old, she finished seventh in the event final of the women's 200-meter breaststroke with a time of 3:18.2.

External links
 

1915 births
2000 deaths
American female breaststroke swimmers
Olympic swimmers of the United States
Swimmers from Detroit
Swimmers at the 1932 Summer Olympics
20th-century American women
20th-century American people